Julien Mory Sidibé (1927 – March 17, 2003) was a Roman Catholic bishop in Mali from 1974 until his death.

Born in the village of Goualala, Mali, Julien Mory Sidibé began his education at a local Catholic missionary school, later studying at the seminary at Goumi in Upper Volta (now Burkina Faso). In 1957, he was ordained a priest in Bougouni, Mali.  For five years he directed the catechism school of Faladie, then that of Ntonimba.

In 1971, he began working on his dissertation in theology in France, and was soon informed by Luc Sangare, archbishop of Bamako, that he would be made a bishop on his return to Mali, a post Sidibé took in 1974.  He is particularly remembered for a speech at Mali's 1991 National Conference in which he supported the country's transition to a more democratic political system.

He was Bishop of Ségou from 1974 until his death.

References
This article began as a translation of the corresponding French article, which cites the following as a source:

Le Segovien article

1927 births
2003 deaths
20th-century Roman Catholic bishops in Mali
21st-century Roman Catholic bishops in Mali
People from Sikasso Region
Roman Catholic bishops of Ségou